The 1975–76 Polska Liga Hokejowa season was the 41st season of the Polska Liga Hokejowa, the top level of ice hockey in Poland. Four teams participated in the league, and Podhale Nowy Targ won the championship.

Regular season

External links
 Season on hockeyarchives.info

Polska
Polska Hokej Liga seasons
Liga